P. Baigneres (given name unknown) was a tennis player competing for France. He finished runner-up to H. Briggs in the singles event of the inaugural Amateur French Championships in 1891.

Grand Slam finals

Singles: 1 (0-1)

References

French male tennis players
Year of birth missing
Year of death missing